Sphecodes decorus is a species of bee in the genus Sphecodes, of the family Halictidae. S. decorus has been documented in India and Sri Lanka.

References

 http://www.atlashymenoptera.net/biblio/Karunaratne_et_al_2006_Sri_Lanka.pdf
 http://animaldiversity.org/accounts/Sphecodes_decorus/classification/
 https://www.itis.gov/servlet/SingleRpt/SingleRpt?search_topic=TSN&search_value=759919

Halictidae
Hymenoptera of Asia
Insects of India
Insects of Sri Lanka
Insects described in 1897